Nerthus taivanicus is a species of pentatomomorphan bug in the family Heterogastridae, found in eastern and southeastern Asia.

References

External links

 

Lygaeoidea
Hemiptera of Asia
Insects described in 1914